Sarah Dawn Mitton (born 20 June 1996) is a Canadian athlete specializing in the shot put. She is the 2022 Commonwealth and 2019 Summer Universiade champion, and represented Canada at the 2020 Summer Olympics.

Career

Youth and university (2013–2019)
Mitton was born in Liverpool, Nova Scotia and raised in Brooklyn. A student athlete, she began throwing while in junior high school, but also participated in other events, and made the Nova Scotian heptathlon team in 2013. After graduating from Liverpool High School in 2014, she was accepted to the University of Windsor on an athletic scholarship. International assignments eluded Mitton in the early years of her career, narrowly missing qualification for both the 2013 World Youth Championships and the 2014 World Junior Championships. In 2015 she won the Canadian junior title in shot put, which led to her first international assignment, the Pan American Junior Championships. Competing on home soil in Edmonton, she finished in fourth place, 0.77 metres behind bronze medalist Sophia Rivera.

Continuing to distinguish herself during her studies at Windsor, Mitton won the U Sports title and was named USports female field athlete of the year in 2018. The university also bestowed upon her the DeMarco Award, in recognition of students who combined "academic achievement with athletic prowess." Internationally, she competed at two Summer Universiades, finishing tenth in her first appearance in 2017 before taking gold in the shot put at the 2019 Summer Universiade in Naples. Mitton described it as "overwhelming" that her first international medal was a gold medal.

After graduating with a Bachelor of Science degree, Mitton delayed plans to pursue further studies in marine biology to continue her athletics career, relocating to Toronto and for a time residing with fellow Canadian shot putter Brittany Crew. Following her Universiade victory, she made two other major international appearances in 2019, finishing sixth at the 2019 Pan American Games in Lima, and then making her World Championship debut at the 2019 edition in Doha. Mitton placed twenty-fourth in the qualification round, and did not advance to the event final. She would later attribute her performance to fatigue after a long season.

Tokyo Olympics and onward (2020–present)
Mitton and Crew opted to travel to New Zealand in February of 2020 after a short off-season, aiming to gain experience in advance of the Olympics. Mitton obtained the necessary Olympic qualification mark at an event in Auckland, also setting a new personal best of 18.84 m, but said that the most gratifying element was competing against and beating legendary New Zealand shot putter Dame Valerie Adams. Returning to Canada in early March, she had intended only a short visit to Nova Scotia before turning to Toronto, but the onset of the COVID-19 pandemic meant she remained at home for several months. The pandemic significantly affected the international athletic calendar in 2020, including the delay by a full year of the 2020 Summer Olympics, but Mitton continued training and credited Crew as a valuable partner and rival in local events. She was eventually named to the Canadian team for the Tokyo Olympics, but was twenty-eighth in the qualification round and did not advance to the final. Her later recollection of the episode noted "throwing 16 metres at the Olympics was not fun. I don't want to be in that position ever again."

Continuing to make major strides in 2022, Mitton began by breaking the Canadian indoor record at an invitational challenge in New York with a throw of 19.16 m. She then was seventh in her World Indoor Championships debut. In May, she broke Crew's Canadian outdoor record with a throw of 19.58 m. This in turn earned Mitton her first ever Diamond League invitation, to attend the 2022 Bislett Games in Oslo, a longstanding goal. She placed sixth at the Bislett Games. She then broke the national record again in June with a 20.33 m throw at the Canadian Track and Field Championships. This stood as the best throw in the world to that point in the year. Her second Diamond League appearance, at the BAUHAUS-galan in Stockholm, saw her win the silver medal with a 19.90 m throw.

Mitton then competed in the shot put event of the 2022 World Athletics Championships in Eugene, placing second in qualification. In the final she finished fourth overall, with her sixth and final 19.77 m throw equaling the best of Dutch bronze medalist Jessica Schilder, but losing the tiebreaker based on their second-best throw. It was the highest placement ever for a Canadian woman in the shot put. She reasoned afterward that "Doha was 24th. Olympics I was 28th. So to come back and be fourth at a world championship, I think there's a lot more to come." A month later she was part of her first Commonwealth Games team, for the 2022 edition in Birmingham. In third place in the shot put final after five throws, with her final attempt she registered at 19.03 m, 0.05 ahead of defending champion Danniel Thomas-Dodd of Jamaica. Thomas-Dodd failed to regain her place with her own final attempt, earning Mitton the gold medal. She said afterward that "the goal from the beginning was to go out and win it, and we achieved it, though not the way we expected. The competition started out really rough and I started doubting myself mid-competition and pulled myself back… you just have to believe in yourself." At the 2022 NACAC Championships in Freeport, Mitton won the gold medal with a 20.15 metre throw, her second over twenty metres of the year. She then concluded the season in the Diamond League Final in Zurich, winning the silver medal.

International competitions

References

External links
 
 
 
 
 

1996 births
Living people
Canadian female shot putters
World Athletics Championships athletes for Canada
Athletes (track and field) at the 2019 Pan American Games
Pan American Games track and field athletes for Canada
Universiade gold medalists in athletics (track and field)
Universiade gold medalists for Canada
Competitors at the 2017 Summer Universiade
Medalists at the 2019 Summer Universiade
Athletes (track and field) at the 2020 Summer Olympics
People from Queens County, Nova Scotia
Sportspeople from Nova Scotia
Olympic track and field athletes of Canada
20th-century Canadian women
21st-century Canadian women
Commonwealth Games gold medallists for Canada
Commonwealth Games medallists in athletics
Athletes (track and field) at the 2022 Commonwealth Games
Medallists at the 2022 Commonwealth Games